Elizabeth Stone may refer to

 Anne-Elizabeth Stone (born 1990), American fencer
 Elizabeth Stone, American Paralympic swimmer 
 Elizabeth Stone (photographer), American photographer 
 Elizabeth Hickok Robbins Stone (1801–1895), American pioneer
 Elizabeth W. Stone (1918–2002), American librarian and educator